Joëlle Desjardins Paquette is a Canadian film director and screenwriter from Quebec, who won the Borsos Competition award for Best Director of a Borsos Competition Film at the 2022 Whistler Film Festival for her 2022 film Rodeo (Rodéo). The film was subsequently nominated for the John Dunning Best First Feature Award at the 11th Canadian Screen Awards in 2023.

She previously directed a number of short films, as well as television and webseries episodes. Her 2012 short Wintergreen (Paparmane) was named to the Toronto International Film Festival's annual year-end Canada's Top Ten list in 2012.

Filmography
Timbré – 2007
Wintergreen (Paparmane) – 2012
Apnées – 2012
Voir le ciel – 2012
Sans dehors ni dedans – 2015
Beyond Blue Waves (Flots gris) – 2016
Rapkeb Allstarz – 2018
Une vue sous les étoiles – 2020
Rosalie dans ta cuisine – 2021
Parfaitement imparfait – 2021
Rodeo (Rodéo) – 2022

References

External links

21st-century Canadian screenwriters
21st-century Canadian women writers
Canadian women screenwriters
Canadian screenwriters in French
Canadian women film directors
Film directors from Quebec
Writers from Quebec
French Quebecers
Living people
Year of birth missing (living people)